XNH or xnh may refer to:

 XNH, the IATA code for Nasiriyah Airport, Iraq
 xnh, the ISO 639-3 code for Kuan language, China